is a 2015 action role-playing game developed by Nihon Falcom. The game was developed out of Nihon Falcom's desire to create a game of a different type and setting than their other role-playing game franchises, The Legend of Heroes and Ys. The game was first released in Japan for the PlayStation Vita in September 2015, and worldwide in June 2017. 

An enhanced version of the game, Tokyo Xanadu eX+, was released in Japan for the PlayStation 4 in September 2016, and worldwide in December 2017, in addition to a Windows version. A port for the Nintendo Switch is scheduled for release in Japan in June 2023.

Gameplay
It is an action role-playing game with party-based real-time combat that features dungeon exploration, similar to the Persona series by Atlus, as well as Falcom's own Ys and Trails franchises.

Plot

In an alternate reality, Tokyo was hit by a huge earthquake in 2005 that took the city a decade to recover from. The game's protagonist, Kou Tokisaka, is a high school student who lives in Morimiya on the outskirts of Tokyo in 2015. He lives alone and has some part time jobs. One day after work, late at night, he sees his classmate Asuka Hiiragi is around some bad company. Kou follows them to a back alley. When he tries to get in between them, he is sucked into a vortex that brings him to the nightmare realm Eclipse. Afterwards Asuka explains to Kou she is a member of Nemesis, a group that tries to close the Eclipse vortexes for good.

Asuka accepts Kou's assistance for the time being. During their missions they discover many wielders in their academy, people capable of fighting Greeds, the Eclipse inhabitants: Sora Ikushima, a first year and a martial artist; Yuuki Shinomiya, a first year and a genius; Shio Takahata, a third year and former co-leader of a street gang called Blaze; Mitsuki Hokuto, a third year and student council member, who is also the heir to Hokuto group that formed Zodiac which is involved with Eclipse and recruit them respectively. During a weekend vacation, Asuka and Mitsuki explain that Eclipse started spreading worldwide after the Great War II and that it was the cause of the earthquake ten years ago dubbed Tokyo Twilight Disaster. They also meet Rem, a girl who is an inhabitant of Eclipse and is known as the Child of Eclipse in the underworld.

Kou and his allies decide to form a school club as a cover for their mission and call it Xanadu Research Club (X.R.C). During an incident they discover that another second year named Rion Kugayama, who is also a member of famous idol group called SPiKA, is a wielder and convince her to join them. They also realize in another incident that their English teacher, Gorou Saeki is actually a member of Japan-Self Defense Force: Zero Battalion Aegis, a platoon tasked with fighting the Eclipse who also join them. When they supposedly prevented another Twilight Disaster, the entire city is engulfed by an Eclipse and they are separated.

During this new incident, they learn that Jun Kohinata, one of Kou's classmates and friends is in fact a Seal Knight of Orden, an organization belonging to the church and is tasked with fighting the Eclipse as well. After the X.R.C members and their allies regroup, they form a plan to assault the source of the Eclipse; when they reach it, they realize its Shiori Kurashiki, Kou's childhood friend and classmate. She then explains that real Shiori died during the disaster ten years ago, but before her death wished everything was a lie after witnessing Kou's sorrow. In a sense this wish was granted by a mythical Greed called the Twilight Apostle and brought a fake Shiori back to life. Due to Apostle's influence within her, the number of Eclipse incident in Morimiya was increased, and while the town believes she is alive, the rest of the world confirmed her as dead and so the entire world must be engulfed in Eclipse so that fact would change, but the X.R.C members defeat her and she passes away after a tearful goodbye with her friends. The town returns to normal and all people's memory of Eclipse and Shiori is erased except for the wielders. Asuka then asks Kou to walk her to her home in Brick Alley.

In the game's normal ending, while Asuka tries to convince Kou that nothing is his fault, they meet a girl who looks a lot like Shiori and seems to recognize them, after that the two of them go to the cafe that Asuka stays in. In the game's true ending, which can be accessed after meeting certain qualifications and seeing the normal ending once, they hear Shiori's voice and are instructed by Rem to visit Shiori's home. Once the entire X.R.C gathered there, they find an Eclipse gate which requires some keys. After recovering the keys and entering the gate, they meet the mythical Nine-tailed Fox who explains to them that he has retrieved the real Shiori's spirit and truly resurrected her as a priestess for himself. He then challenges the group to a fight and offers Shiori as a reward if they defeat him and they succeed. Kou then retrieves Shiori and has a tearful reunion with her, everyone's memory about Shiori has been restored as well. In the night of that event the X.R.C members and all their allies enjoy the Summer Festival.

The enhanced version of the game contains some side stories taking place between the chapters of the main story, and an After Story which takes place after the true ending of the game. The side stories include all X.R.C members except for Kou, Jun Kohinata the Seal Knight and an Armoured soldier who is later revealed to be Gorou Saeki investigating a strange form of Eclipse.
In the After Story, Morimiya is preparing for Autumnn Festival, but members of the X.R.C and all their allies, including Ryouta Ibuki, one of Kou's old friends and classmates, are taken into a Eclipse that is identical to Morimiya by a child wearing a fox-mask. After they regroup, the child's mask is broken and is revealed as a young Kou. He then explains that he is the Twilight Apostle, the being responsible for the Tokyo Twilight Disaster who almost defeated that day but managed to survive after granting Shiori's wish. Since then he was moving between the Eclipse and the real world to gain power and is going to use his new powers to destroy everything, but the heroes fight him and defeat him.

After the Apostle's downfall, the group returned to the real world. They have one final encounter with Rem before the event. Kou asks her if she knows why the Twilight Disaster happened and why the Twilight Apostle came to be, and she confirms that she does but all she says is that it was supposed to. She tells them that there will be a time when they need to make choices again and she will be there to observe them. The X.R.C members and their allies then swear to prepare themselves for the battles that have yet to come, the festival starts afterwards and everyone enjoy themselves.

Development

Nihon Falcom announced the game in December 2014. The company referred to the game as an "urban myth action rpg". They also emphasized that they wanted to create a game with a different feel than their other role-playing game franchises, such as the Ys and Trails series. While being based on the Xanadu series, which includes Xanadu (1985) and Xanadu Next (2005), Falcom set out to create a game with a different feel than their other fantasy-based role-playing game franchises, with the game taking place in a fictional district of modern-day Tokyo called Morimiya City, incorporating the use of elements not seen in their other series, such as smartphones. Morimiya was based on actual locations near Nihon Falcom's head offices in Tachikawa. For example, the Morimiya Station Plaza, with its red arch monument, closely resembles the north exit of Tachikawa Station, which has a similar-looking blue arch monument. Falcom held promotional activities at various real-world locations in Tachikawa, including a Tokyo Xanadu-themed menu at the cafe in Books Orion, an actual Japanese bookstore chain with a location in Tachikawa that appears in-game.

The game was released for the PlayStation Vita in Japan on September 30, 2015. An English version of the game was not announced for almost a year after its initial Japanese release, leaving the game's fate in the West uncertain at the time. Journalists had considered it as a likely candidate for game localization by Xseed Games, due to their close relationship with Falcom from localizing entries in their Ys and Trails games. Other journalists mistook the Xanadu related trademark leaked in January 2015 as a sign of it being translated by XSeed, though this was actually in reference to Xanadu Next.

An enhanced version of the game for the PlayStation 4, Tokyo Xanadu eX+, was released in Japan on September 8, 2016. The PS4 version contains improved graphical fidelity and an improved frame rate, as well as additional story content in the form of extra side-stories and post-game content. Aksys Games got publishing rights for localizing the Vita version of the game in English, which was released on June 30, 2017. Additionally, they contracted British games publisher Ghostlight to help port eX+ to Windows, where it was released on December 8. A Nintendo Switch port of eX+ is scheduled for release on June 29, 2023 in Japan, featuring a high-speed mode and all previously released downloadable content.

Reception

Famitsu gave the game a review score of 32/40. The game sold a total of 88,879 retail copies within its first week of release in Japan, topping the software sales charts for that particular week, with over 112,000 being sold within three weeks.

Notes

References

External links
  
  

2015 video games
Action role-playing video games
High school-themed video games
Japanese role-playing video games
PlayStation Vita games
PlayStation 4 games
Video games developed in Japan
Video games set in 2015
Video games set in Tokyo
Video game spin-offs
Windows games
Nihon Falcom games
Single-player video games
Ghostlight games